Đào Thị Miện (born 17 July 1981) is a Vietnamese retired footballer who played as a defender. She has been a member of the Vietnam women's national team.

Club career
Đào Thị Miện has played Hà Tây and Hà Nội I for Vietnam.

International career
Đào Thị Miện capped for Vietnam during two AFC Women's Asian Cup editions (2008 and 2010).

International goals

References

1981 births
Living people
Vietnamese women's footballers
Women's association football defenders
Vietnam women's international footballers
21st-century Vietnamese women